Salmanov is an Azerbaijani and Russian masculine surname, its feminine counterpart is Salmanova. It may refer to
Anar Salmanov (born 1980), Azerbaijani football referee
Farman Salmanov (1931–2007), Azerbaijani geologist
Vadim Salmanov (1912–1978), Russian composer

Azerbaijani-language surnames
Russian-language surnames